The White House in Washington, D.C., is the official residence of the president of the United States. Being the official residence of the U.S. head of state, it flies the U.S. flag from a flagpole on its rooftop. The U.S. flag is flown there 24 hours a day and seven days a week.

History

As the official residence of the U.S. head of state, the United States' national flag is permanently displayed from the White House's rooftop flagpole. Contrary to popular misconception, that U.S. flag is not lowered or removed from the flagpole when the U.S. president departs from the building's premises, but remains flying. This has been the case since September 1970, when then–U.S. president Richard M. Nixon mandated this practice on the suggestion of his wife and the then–U.S. first lady, Pat Nixon.

Aside from the U.S. flag, other flags have occasionally been flown from the rooftop flagpole on the White House. The only foreign national flags to have been flown there are those of Serbia and France, the former flown alongside the U.S. flag in July 1918 as a show of solidarity by the United States towards the Serbian people during World War I, and the latter done in July 1920 to commemorate the French Bastille Day.

The U.S. flag that is displayed on the rooftop flagpole on top the White House is often lowered to half-staff on the direction of the U.S. president in order to commemorate a certain occasion or object, such as a person or persons important to the United States who had recently died (such as prominent political figures like U.S. senators and congressmen).

See also

Flags at Buckingham Palace

References

Flags of the United States
White House